William B. Quandt (born November 23, 1941) is an American scholar, author, professor emeritus in the Department of Politics at the University of Virginia. He previously served as senior fellow in the Foreign Policy Studies Program at the Brookings Institution and as a member on the National Security Council in the Richard Nixon and Jimmy Carter administrations. He was actively involved in the negotiations that led to the Camp David Accords and the Egypt–Israel peace treaty. His areas of expertise include Algeria, Egypt, Israel, Palestine, the Israeli–Palestinian peace process, and U.S. foreign policy.

Early life
Quandt was born in 1941 in Los Angeles, California. He received his BA in International Relations from Stanford University in 1963, and his Ph.D. in political science from MIT in 1968. He has received several research grants, including ones from the Social Science Research Council (1966–1968), and the Council on Foreign Relations (1972–1973). He was also an associate professor of political science at the University of Pennsylvania, worked at the Rand Corporation in the Department of Social Science from 1968 to 1972, and taught at UCLA and MIT.

Professional career
Quandt served as a staff member on the National Security Council in the Nixon and Carter administrations between 1972–1974 and 1977–1979. He was actively involved in the negotiations that led to the Camp David Accords and the Egyptian–Israeli Peace Treaty.

Between 1979 and 1994, Quandt was a Senior Fellow in the Foreign Policy Studies Program at the Brookings Institution, where he conducted research on the Middle East, American policy toward the Arab–Israeli conflict, and energy policy.

From 1987 to 1988, William Quandt was president of the Middle East Studies Association, a learned society. He joined the Department of Politics at the University of Virginia in 1994, where he held the departmental Edward R. Stettinius chair. He taught courses on the Middle East and American Foreign Policy. From 2000 to 2003, he also served as their Vice Provost for International Affairs. In 2004, he was elected to the American Academy of Arts and Sciences. After the fall semester of 2012, Quandt retired from his teaching career at UVa. Professor Schulhofer-Wohl, his replacement, commended his legacy by point out that "more than 200 students take [his class] every year, and that's clearly due in no small part to Dr. Quandt and what he brings to it. It's an amazing opportunity for me to be able to work so closely with such a distinguished scholar in this way. I don't think many people have that kind of chance."

Quandt's book, Peace Process, along with The Other Arab–Israeli Conflict by Steven L. Spiegel and American Presidents and the Middle East, by George Lenczowski, are considered by historian (and the former Israeli ambassador to the United States), Michael Oren, as being "three of the genre's finer examples", focusing on the post-World War II period and seeking to investigate broader aspects of America's Middle East history.

Personal life
He is married to the writer Helena Cobban, has one daughter and two stepchildren, and lives in Washington D.C.  He was a member of the Council on Foreign Relations, and served on the board of trustees of the American University in Cairo and that of the Foundation for Middle East Peace.

Books and articles
William Quandt has written numerous books, and his articles have appeared in a wide variety of publications. His books include:
 Troubled Triangle: The United States, Turkey and Israel in the New Middle East, Editor (Just World Books, 2011) 
 Peace Process: American Diplomacy and the Arab–Israeli Conflict Since 1967, (Brookings, 2005, third edition)
 Between Ballots and Bullets: Algeria's Transition from Authoritarianism, (Brookings, 1998)
 The United States and Egypt: An Essay on Policy for the 1990s, (Brookings, 1990)
 The Middle East: Ten Years After Camp David, (Brookings, 1988), as editor.
 Camp David: Peacemaking and Politics, (Brookings, 1986)
 Saudi Arabia in the 1980s: Foreign Policy, Security, and Oil, (Brookings, 1981)
 Decade of Decisions: American Foreign Policy Toward the Arab–Israeli Conflict, 1967–1976, (University of California Press, 1977)
 Revolution and Political Leadership: Algeria, 1954–1968, (MIT Press, 1969).

References

External links

Personal Notes on the Camp David Summit by William B. Quandt (published online in 2019)

Middle Eastern studies in the United States
1941 births
University of Virginia faculty
Living people
Fellows of the American Academy of Arts and Sciences
Academics from California
Writers from Los Angeles
Stanford University alumni
MIT School of Humanities, Arts, and Social Sciences alumni